Neil Munro (25 January 1868 – 4 September 1948) was a Scottish footballer who played for Abercorn and Scotland.

References

External links

London Hearts profile

Scottish footballers
1868 births
1948 deaths
Abercorn F.C. players
Scotland international footballers
Association footballers not categorized by position